Australia participated at the 2010 Winter Olympics in Vancouver, British Columbia, Canada. A team of forty athletes was selected to compete in eleven sports. The Chef de Mission was Ian Chesterman who has held the position since the 1998 Winter Olympics.

Australia achieved its best ever results, winning two gold medals; in the women's aerials (Lydia Lassila) and women's snowboard halfpipe (Torah Bright); and a silver in the men's moguls. To date Australia has won a total of five gold medals, one silver medal and three bronze medals in Winter Olympic competition.

Medalists

Alpine skiing

Biathlon

Bobsleigh

Cross-country skiing

Figure skating

Freestyle skiing

Men's team – aerials and moguls

Men's team – ski cross

Women's team – aerials and moguls

Women's team – ski cross

Luge

Short track speed skating

Skeleton

Snowboarding

Halfpipe

Parallel giant slalom

Snowboard cross

Speed skating

See also
 Australia at the 2010 Winter Paralympics

References

2010 in Australian sport
Nations at the 2010 Winter Olympics
2010
Winter sports in Australia